The Sucker Punch Show is the third full-length album released by indie rock band Lovedrug. It was released in 2008 by The Militia Group. Lyrics by Michael Shepard. Music by Michael Shepard, Jeremy Michael Gifford, Thomas Bragg and James Childress.

Track listing
"Let It All Out" – 2:49
"Only One" – 3:21
"Blood Like" – 4:29
"Everyone Needs a Halo" – 4:25
"The Dirtiest Queen" – 4:56
"Borrowed Legs" – 4:49
"Broken Home" – 3:23
"Fake Angels" – 5:44
"My World" – 4:54
"Hanté Bruit" – 1:01
"Panicked Witness" – 6:57
"Dying Days" – 4:27

References

2008 albums
Lovedrug albums
The Militia Group albums
Albums produced by Michael Beinhorn